Saighton is a former civil parish, now in the parish of Aldford and Saighton, in Cheshire West and Chester, England. It contains 15 buildings that are recorded in the National Heritage List for England as designated listed buildings.  Of these, one is listed at Grade I, the highest grade, one is listed at Grade II*, the middle grade, and the others are at Grade II.  Apart from the village of Saighton, the parish is rural, and includes the gateway of one of the monastic granges of St Werburgh's Abbey, Chester; this, with addition of later buildings, has been converted into a private college.  The college buildings are listed, together with the primary school, the parish church, houses and adjoining walls, a farmhouse and farm buildings, a water tower, and a telephone kiosk.

Key

Buildings

See also
Listed buildings in Rowton
Listed buildings in Waverton
Listed buildings in Golborne David
Listed buildings in Handley
Listed buildings in Coddington
Listed buildings in Churton by Farndon
Listed buildings in Poulton
Listed buildings in Eaton
Listed buildings in Eccleston
Listed buildings in Huntington

References
Citations

Sources

Listed buildings in Cheshire West and Chester
Lists of listed buildings in Cheshire